Mehran Jafari (born April 27, 1985) is an Iranian footballer who plays for Shahrdari Ardabil in Azadegan League.

Club career
Until 2012 Jafari played his entire career with Malavan.

Club career statistics

 Assist Goals

References

External links
 Mehran Jafari at Football Federation Islamic Republic of Iran

1985 births
Living people
Malavan players
Iranian footballers
People from Khalkhal, Iran
Shahrdari Ardabil players
Association football midfielders